"Enough Is Enough" is a 100-page resignation letter written by Davison L. Budhoo, an economist from Grenada. Budhoo served as a senior economist at the International Monetary Fund (IMF) for 12 years until May 1988. His public resignation letter was sent to Michel Camdessus, the then managing directory of the IMF. The letter accused the IMF of extensive and systematic statistical fraud, which was then used to impose policies on developing countries. Budhoo claimed that the consequences of these policies led to massive poverty and starvation. The letter resulted in two studies commissioned by the government of Trinidad and Tobago (which had had its credit rating hit due to the false statistics forcing it to seek help from the IMF) that confirmed his accusations.

The Canadian author Naomi Klein reported on the letter in her 2007 book, The Shock Doctrine.

References

External links 
The first 29 pages of Budhoo's original letter, "Enough Is Enough"
An interview with Budhoo about the resignation letter
Article summarizing Budhoo's resignation letter

Economy of Trinidad and Tobago
Economic policy
Financial scandals
Works about the International Monetary Fund
May 1988 events
1988 works